A Convergence of Birds is a collection of experimental fiction and poetry inspired by the artwork of Joseph Cornell. Jonathan Safran-Foer, while still an unpublished college-student, solicited his favorite authors to write about Cornell prints which he sent them in the mail along with his request for submissions.  He was surprised when many of most famous and well-regarded personages on his list—including Joyce Carol Oates, Rick Moody, Barry Lopez, and others—responded enthusiastically to his proposal.  These respondents, he writes, "were believers.  But not in me and my maladroit proposal.  It wasn't my supplication they were responding to, it was Cornell's--not even Cornell's, but that of his boxes.  The boxes called the writers from great distances; they demanded the attention of those who had no attention to spare."

Table of Contents

"Emory Bird Hands' Birds" by Barry Lopez
"Rowing In Eden"by Erik Anderson Reece
"It Generally Leads a Solitary Life or Lives in Pairs" by Rick Moody
"The Box Artist" by Joyce Carol Oates
"Showing An Episode" by Diane Williams
"The Cursive Example" by Howard Norman
"Construction" by John Burghardt
"Boxed In" by Paul West
"Nine Boxes" by Siri Hustvedt
"The Grand Hotels" by Robert Coover
"For Brother Robert" by Bradford Morrow
"Magic Musée" by Martine Bellen
"The Appearance of Things" by Dale Peck
"Slide Show" by Joanna Scott
"Of A Feather" by Diana Ackerman
"Bookmark, Horizon (Emily Dickinson)" by Ann Lauterbach
"Because I Could Not Stop For Death" by Mary Caponegro
"Grid Box" by Rosmarie Waldrop
"Song" by Robert Pinsky
"The Impetus Was Delight" by Lydia Davis
"Poem In Which a Bird Does Some of the Talking" by John Yau
"If the Aging Magician Should Start to Believe" by Jonathan Safran Foer

Summary and reception

The pieces in this book range from straight fiction and straight poetry, to experimental works.  Rick Moody's piece("It Generally Leads a Solitary Life or Lives in Pairs"), for example, presents a collage of lines cut and pasted from other love stories as a love story. These collages appears to be an attempt to mimic Cornell's methodology for box construction in a textual format.  The narrative content of each piece also varies.  Some address Cornell's boxes directly, while others tell stories inspired by the boxes, but not directly referring to the boxes.

The book was acknowledged alongside other major works which have approached Cornell as a literary subject in the New York Times.  Roscoe, author of the Times article, points out that the literary responses to the Cornell boxes are part of a correspondence.   "Best known for his glass-covered box creations, many of them made in tribute to people he idealized, Cornell has elicited just as many tributes himself. John Ashbery, Octavio Paz, Stanley Kunitz and Robert Pinsky all wrote poems for him. He’s been immortalized in music and plays. Many of the books about (Cornell) — from Dore Ashton’s “Joseph Cornell Album” to Charles Simic’s improbably beautiful “Dime-Store Alchemy” to Jonathan Safran Foer’s anthology “A Convergence of Birds” — could themselves be described in Cornellian terms: collage-like, experimental, quixotic."

References

American poetry collections
2001 books